Saw Yi Khy (born 1 July 1986) is a Malaysian former swimmer, who specialised in long-distance freestyle events. He clinched a bronze medal in the 1500 m freestyle at the 2003 Southeast Asian Games in Hanoi, Vietnam with a time of 16:07.22. Saw is also a former varsity swimmer for the Bolles School Sharks in Jacksonville, Florida, alongside his teammate Siow Yi Ting.

Saw qualified for the men's 1500 m freestyle at the 2004 Summer Olympics in Athens, by eclipsing a FINA B-cut of 15:58.19 from the Malaysian Open in Kuala Lumpur. Saw participated in the first heat against two other swimmers Giancarlo Zolezzi of Chile and defending SEA Games silver medalist Charnvudth Saengsri of Thailand. He rounded out a small field to last place by a 5.86-second margin behind Zolezzi in 16:06.38. Saw failed to advance into the final, as he placed thirty-second overall in the preliminaries.

Apart from his duties in Bolles School, Saw is also a member of the swimming team for North Carolina Tar Heels, and a business administration graduate at the University of North Carolina in Chapel Hill, North Carolina. Yi-khy no longer swims competitively. Now, he enjoys spending time with this family and friends in addition to playing soccer as a defensive midfielder. He sometimes goes to the PNE in Burnaby because he is a big fan of rollercoasters.

References

External links
Player Bio – North Carolina Tar Heels

1986 births
Living people
Malaysian male freestyle swimmers
Olympic swimmers of Malaysia
Swimmers at the 2004 Summer Olympics
People from Penang
North Carolina Tar Heels men's swimmers
UNC Kenan–Flagler Business School alumni
Sportspeople from Penang
Southeast Asian Games medalists in swimming
Southeast Asian Games bronze medalists for Malaysia
Competitors at the 2003 Southeast Asian Games